Viola silicestris, commonly known as sandstone violet, is a perennial herb of the genus Viola native to southeastern Australia. It is described by Kevin Thiele & Suzanne Prober in  the journal Telopea in 2006

References

External links
 Australia's Virtual Herbarium: Viola silicestris occurrence records.

Flora of New South Wales
Malpighiales of Australia
silicestris
Plants described in 2003
Taxa named by Kevin Thiele
Taxa named by Suzanne Mary Prober